Parc des Bains is a park located in the region of Jura, in the Franche-Comté of eastern France. It was built under Camille Prost and was completed in 1904. In the late 19th century, Camille Prost wanted to create a spa in the city of Lons-le-Saunier, to showcase its salt water. The park, covering 7 hectares, was built to embellish the surrounding area and was designed by the French horticulturist and landscape architect H. Michel.

Main features
The park is consistent and has not been greatly modified since its inception. Floristically, it presents a rare richness and diversity. It consists of a treated landscaped garden bordered by winding paths around the lawn. The park has beautiful old trees. It resembles a typical landscape project of the late 19th century, being rich in species diversity and quality, including redwoods, tulip-trees, lime-trees, honey locusts, Japanese sophoras, and Mexican acacias. The fountains were installed in the early 1960.

References

Patrice de Moncan, Paris- les jardins du Baron Haussmann, (2009). Les Éditions du Mécène,.
Dominique Jarrassé, Grammaire des jardins Parisiens (2007), Parigramme,

Parks in France
Franche-Comté